Jan Kubice (born 3 October 1953) is a Czech politician, who served as Minister of the Interior of the Czech Republic from April 2011 to July 2013. He was previously in charge of the Unit for Combating Organised Crime.

References

External links

1953 births
Living people
Czech police officers
Czech Protestants
Interior ministers of the Czech Republic